A list of Bangladeshi films released in 1982.

Releases

References

See also

1982 in Bangladesh

Film
Bangladesh
 1982